The Curriculum Open-Access Resources in Economics Project (CORE Econ) is an organisation that creates and distributes open-access teaching material on economics. The goal is to make teaching material and reform the economics curriculum. Its textbook is taught as an introductory course at almost 400 universities. It provides its materials online, at no cost to users. It is registered as a charity (CORE Economics Education) in England and Wales.

Origins

At the time, Professor Carlin wrote to colleagues to suggest they collaborate to revise the curriculum, noting that "altering the course of the undergraduate curriculum is like turning around a half a million ton super tanker. But I think that the time may be right for the initiative I am inviting you to join me in proposing."

Following the financial crisis of 2007–2008, students had formed groups, such as the International Student Initiative for Pluralist Economics (ISIPE) and Rethinking Economics, to demand improvements to the mainstream economics curriculum. ISIPE, for example, argued that "teaching in economics departments is too narrowly focused and more effort should be made to broaden the curriculum". Professor Carlin has written that:

"The textbook model is definitely broken. In it, economic actors are amoral and self-interested, perfectly competitive market prices equate supply to demand implementing “optimal” outcomes, while environmental degradation, instability, and inequality are afterthoughts at best … Yet it continues as the backbone of much undergraduate teaching. However remote from what economists really do and the way we think, this is the “economics” imprinted on the public’s mind."

Launched in October 2013 at HM Treasury, CORE Econ said its mission was to address these issues by creating a textbook incorporating contributions from many academics with different points of view that was "humbler, more empirical and more topical". Professor Carlin wrote that students "are embarrassed when they are no more able to explain the eurozone crisis or persistent unemployment than their fellow students in engineering or archaeology", and that CORE Econ would ensure that "digital technology and interactive teaching methods will introduce students to an empirical discipline. They will learn to use evidence from history, experiments and other data sources to test competing explanations and policies."

Course material

CORE Econ's courses are offered through open access online ebooks published on its web site. Its ebooks use a Creative Commons license so that "any user can customize, translate, or improve it for their own use or the use of their students."

The Economy

The Economy is the flagship publication of CORE Econ. A textbook in 22 chapters that provides a complete introduction to economics and is used in more than 300 universities worldwide.

This economics textbook was designed as the source material for taught courses in the first year of an undergraduate degree, although it has also been used in schools, and for advanced courses in public policy.

As of 2022 this textbook is available in English, Italian, French, Spanish, Finnish, and partially in German and Portuguese.

In 2017, a print version of The Economy was published by Oxford University Press. Since 2019 The Economy is also available as an app for Android, Windows and iOS.

Economy, Society and Public Policy (ESPP)

In 2018, CORE Econ posted the first units of ESPP, an ebook designed to introduce the economics to non-specialists, particularly students from outside economics courses who were taking economics as a minor. Like The Economy, it focuses on topics such as inequality, power, and environmental economics. ESPP is funded by the Nuffield Foundation.

Doing Economics

Also in 2018, CORE Econ posted the first beta units of Doing Economics, a collection of empirical projects designed to teach quantitative methods in economics using real-world data, also funded by the Nuffield Foundation.

Structure and contributors

CORE Economics Education is registered as a charity in England and Wales, with a board of trustees.

The day-to-day running of the project is based at University College London. The course and support materials have been created by academic economists who volunteer their time, including Yann Algan (Sciences Po, Paris), Timothy Besley (London School of Economics), Diane Coyle (University of Manchester), Cameron Hepburn (University of Oxford), Suresh Naidu, Rajiv Sethi, Margaret Stevens (University of Oxford), and Kevin O’Rourke (University of Oxford).

In 2017, CORE USA, based at Barnard College, was set up to improve outreach in the US.

Other prominent economists have contributed to the published material, including Nobel laureates James Heckman, Alvin Roth and Joseph Stiglitz, who recorded videos for it on inequality in education, matching markets and the financial crisis.

Since 2019, the CORE Econ online material embeds the interactive visualizations of Our World in Data throughout the material. This makes all data available for download and allows data selection for specific countries.

Funding
CORE Econ funds its projects through grants. Startup funding was provided by the Institute for New Economic Thinking. Current funders include the Nuffield Foundation, HM Treasury, Friends Provident Foundation, The Bank of England, and the International Economic Association.

Differences from existing economics teaching

CORE Econ's authors claim that popular textbooks such as Principles of Economics by Greg Mankiw are little different in content to the first modern text book, Economics by Paul Samuelson, which was published in 1948, meaning that these textbooks have ignored many of the innovations in economics since then:"What we teach [students] in our intro classes bears little resemblance to how we do economics ourselves. The great mid-20th century thinkers – John Maynard Keynes, Friedrich Hayek, and John Nash – initiated a process that eventually transformed how we now understand the economy, in three ways. Only one of these [Keynes] made it into today's principles course."CORE Econ argues that concepts developed in the second half of the 20th century, such as asymmetric information, strategic social interactions and incomplete contracts should be given greater prominence in undergraduate teaching. It claims that in most universities these ideas are "mentioned, if at all, at the end of the introductory course, or as special topics."

Critical reception
The Economy has been received favourably. The Economist wrote that "[e]arly results are promising":

The Economy does not dumb down economics; it uses maths readily, keeping students engaged through the topicality of the material. Quite early on, students have lessons in the weirdness in economics—from game theory to power dynamics within firms—that makes the subject fascinating and useful but are skimmed over in most introductory courses.In The New Yorker, John Cassidy wrote that "The members of the core team deserve credit for responding to the critics of economics without pandering to them."

Noah Smith praised CORE Econ for "focusing more on hands-on data analysis."

Some curriculum reform campaigners have criticised CORE Econ for being too narrow and prescriptive, and not acknowledging competing schools of thought. Daniel Lapedus, the Rethinking Economics welcomed CORE Econ’s "incorporation of a variety of thinkers in their curriculum, as well as their efforts to make economics more real and engaging for economics students ... But real critical pluralism that reflects the true diversity of real-world perspectives is still a long way off. There is plenty more rethinking yet to be done."

Yuan Yang, one of the founders of Rethinking Economics, told The Financial Times that: “Core is not a pluralist curriculum ... It presents one paradigm, while students should be able to choose among different schools of thought.” The Times Higher Education Supplement called the course "a bold revamp" and wrote that taking CORE in year 1 had improved results in year 2 for students at University College London:The proportion of students gaining a first in the second-year microeconomics module rose from 22 per cent in 2014-15 to 32 per cent in 2015-16, while the proportion awarded third-class honours fell from 28 per cent to 11 per cent. ... In macroeconomics, the proportion gaining firsts was unchanged, but the number who attained a 2:1 rose from 21 per cent in 2014-15 to 36 per cent in 2015-16."

Universities adopting CORE Econ

In December 2019 there are 300 universities worldwide using CORE. These include:

 Adolfo Ibáñez University, Chile
American University of Afghanistan, Kabul, Afghanistan
 Azim Premji University, Bengaluru, India
 Barnard College, New York, US
 Brigham Young University, Utah, US
 Cornell University, New York, US
 Dartmouth College, New Hampshire, US
 Erasmus University College, Erasmus University Rotterdam, Netherlands
 Humboldt University of Berlin, Germany
 King’s College London, UK
 Lahore University of Management Sciences, Pakistan
 Middlebury College, Vermont, US
 Sciences Po Paris, France
 Toulouse School of Economics, France
 Trinity College Dublin, Ireland
 Universidad de los Andes, Bogotá, Colombia
 Université libre de Bruxelles, Belgium
 University of Cape Town, South Africa
 University College London, UK
 University of Bristol, UK
 University of Chile, Santiago, Chile
 University of Exeter, UK
 University of Manchester, UK
 University of Pretoria, South Africa
 University of Reunion Island
University of Stirling, UK
 University of Warwick, UK
 University of Brighton, UK

Publications

CORE Team, The (2017). The Economy, Economics for a Changing World. Oxford: Oxford University Press.

External links
 The CORE Project web site

References 

Economics education